Statistics of L. League in the 1996 season. Nikko Securities Dream Ladies won the championship.

First stage

Second stage

League standings

League awards

Best player

Top scorers

Best eleven

Best young player

Promotion/relegation series

JLSL Challenge match 

 Urawa Ladies F.C. play to Division 1 promotion/relegation Series.

Division 1 promotion/relegation Series 

 OKI FC Winds stay Division 1 in 1997 Season.
 Urawa Ladies FC stay Division 2 in 1997 Season.

See also 
 Empress's Cup

External links 
  Nadeshiko League Official Site

Nadeshiko League seasons
L
Japan
Japan
1996 in Japanese women's sport